Alessandro Abbondanza (born 8 January 1949) is an Italian former football player and manager. A former forward, he spent most of his playing career with Napoli in Serie A, in addition to other, smaller Italian clubs, mainly situated in the Neapolitan region; he also had a spell in Canada with Toronto Blizzard. He later coached Ischia Isolaverde and Sorrento.

References

1949 births
Living people
Footballers from Naples
Italian footballers
Italian expatriate footballers
Italian football managers
Association football forwards
Expatriate soccer players in Canada
Italian expatriate sportspeople in Canada
Serie A players
Serie B players
S.S.C. Napoli players
A.C. Monza players
Pisa S.C. players
S.S. Lazio players
A.S.D. Sorrento players
U.S. Salernitana 1919 players
F.C. Crotone players
Paganese Calcio 1926 players
Toronto Blizzard (1971–1984) players
North American Soccer League (1968–1984) players
A.S.D. Sorrento managers
S.S. Ischia Isolaverde managers